El Canta Autor Del Pueblo is the first studio album by Regional Mexican artist Espinoza Paz. It was released on 18 March 2008, by American Show Latin / Machete Regio.

Background
Before Paz signed a deal with the major label Universal Latino, he released the album Amigo con Derechos in 2008, on a small independent label. Several of the tracks from that album are included on his major label debut El Canta Autor Del Pueblo including "Carcacha Vieja" (Retitled "La Carcacha"), "Amigo con Derechos", "Asi Soy Feliz", "El Celular", "El Bobo" (Retitled "No Soy Un Bobo"), "Un Numero Mas" (Retitled "Ojala"), "Tus Ojos Lindos" (Retitled "Madre Mia") and "La Que Sufre Es Mi Mama".

Track listing
Amigos Con Derechos 
Así Soy Feliz 
Madre Mía
El Celular 
La Carcacha
No Soy Un Bobo 
La Que Sufre Es Mi Mama 
Ojala 
El Próximo Viernes 
La Sorpresa 
Gotitas De Lluvia 
Por Cuanto Me Amarías
El Celular (Version Tololoche) US Bonus Track 
Amigos Con Derecho (Version Tololoche) US Bonus Track 
Ojala (Version Tololoche) US Bonus Track

Charts

Weekly charts

Year-end charts

Sales and certifications

References

Espinoza Paz albums
2008 albums